Notharctus is a genus of adapiform primate that lived in North America and Europe during the late to middle Eocene.

The body form of Notharctus is similar to that of modern rats. Its fingers were elongated for clamping onto branches, including the development of a thumb.

There were at least four different Notharctus species. Fossils from at least seven other potential species have also been discovered.

References

Bibliography

External links 
 Mikko's Phylogeny Archive

Prehistoric strepsirrhines
Prehistoric primate genera
Eocene primates
Ypresian life
Lutetian life
Bartonian life
Wasatchian
Bridgerian
Uintan
Eocene mammals of North America
Fossils of the United States
Paleontology in Colorado
Paleontology in Nevada
Paleontology in New Mexico
Paleontology in Texas
Paleontology in Utah
Paleontology in Wyoming
Fossil taxa described in 1870
Taxa named by Joseph Leidy